Eugene Benson (born 1928) is a Canadian professor of English and a prolific writer, novelist, playwright and librettist.

Early life
Born in Northern Ireland, Benson obtained a bachelor's degree from the National University of Ireland, a master's degree from the University of Western Ontario and his PhD from the University of Toronto.

Career
Benson is the librettist of six operatic works: Heloise and Abelard (1973, performed by the Canadian Opera Company, music by Charles Wilson); Everyman (1974, performed by the Stratford Festival, music by Charles Wilson); Psycho Red (1978, presented by The Guelph Spring Festival, music by Charles Wilson); Ernest, the Importance of Being (2008, performed by Toronto Operetta Theatre, music by Victor Davies); The Auction: A Folk Opera (2012, premiered by Westben Arts Festival Theatre, music by John Burge); A Tale of Two Cities (2016, premiered by Opera in  Concert, Toronto, music by Victor Davies). Everyman and Psycho Red were broadcast by the CBC (Canadian Broadcast Corporation). 

Benson wrote two novels, The Bulls of Ronda (1976) and the political satire Power Game (1980). He has written four plays broadcast on the Canadian Broadcasting Corporation and, with his wife, Renate Benson, has translated plays from Quebec French. In 2003, he and Bill Fraser adapted Powergame as a TV movie, North of America. His plays include The Ram (1967, broadcast by McGill Radio), Joan of Arc’s Violin (broadcast by CBC in 1970 and published and staged in 1972), The Gunner’s Rope,   (broadcast by CBC in 1970 and published and staged in 1972), and The Doctors’ Wife (broadcast by the CBC in 1973). With his wife, Renate Benson, Eugene has translated a number of French Canadian plays. He edited the periodical Canadian Drama. He has written four plays broadcast on the Canadian Broadcasting Corporation and, with his wife, Renate Benson, has translated plays from Quebec French. He edited the periodical Canadian Drama. In 2003 he and Bill Fraser adapted his political satire Powergame (1980) into the TV movie North of America.

Benson's scholarly publications include J.M. Synge (1982), English-Canadian Theatre (1987), The Oxford Companion to Canadian Theatre (1987), The Routledge Encyclopedia of Post-Colonial Literatures in English (1994, 2nd ed. 2005) — the last three co-edited with L.W. Conolly — and The Oxford Companion to Canadian Literature (1997, second edition, with William Toye). He edited the anthology Encounter: Canadian Drama in Four Media (1973) and the scholarly journal Canadian Drama/L’Art dramatique canadien (1980–90).

Benson was President, Administrative Director and Budget Officer of the Guelph Spring Festival for many years, and is a former Chair of the Writers' Union of Canada (1983–84). He was Founding co-President, with Margaret Atwood, of the Canadian Centre of International PEN (1984–85), and served as its Vice-President (1985–90). He was President of PEN Canada in 1984.

In 2019, he published a memoir, The Symmetry of the Tyger, an account of his involvement in Canadian culture.

Personal life 
He married Renate Niklaus, a languages and literature professor at University of Guelph, in 1968. Together they have two sons: Ormonde, a lawyer, and Shaun, an actor. Renate Benson is the author of German Expressionist Drama (1984) and other books.

Works

Works edited
The Oxford Companion to Canadian Literature, co-edited with Willliam Toye (1983, 2nd ed. 2006) 
 The Oxford Companion to Canadian Theatre, co-edited with L.W Connolly (1989)
 Encyclopedia of Post-Colonial Literatures in English, co-edited with L.W. Connolly (1994, reissued 2005)

Works written
 Encounter: Canadian Drama in Four Media (1973)
 Bulls of Ronda, a novel (1976)
 J.M. Synge, a biography (1980)
 Power Game: The Making of a Prime Minister, a novel (1980)
 English Canadian Theatre , co-written with L.W. Connolly (1987)

Libretti for operas 
 Héloise & Abélard (1973)
 Psycho Red, with music by Charles Wilson (1978))
 Earnest, The Importance of Being, with  music by Victor Davies (2008)

References

1928 births
Living people
Canadian literary critics
Northern Ireland emigrants to Canada
University of Western Ontario alumni
University of Toronto alumni